Erigeron goodrichii is a rare species of flowering plant in the family Asteraceae known by the common name Uinta Mountain fleabane.

Erigeron goodrichii has been found only in the northeastern part of the state of Utah in the western United States. It grows at high elevations in the mountains, sometimes above tree line.

Erigeron goodrichii is a tiny perennial herb rarely more than 12 cm (4.8 inches) tall, producing a woody taproot. Stems and leaves are covered with hairs, some of them stiff. The plant sometimes produces only one flower heads per stem, sometimes 2 or 3. Each head contains as many as 60 blue ray florets surrounding numerous yellow disc florets.

Species is named for ecologist Sherel Goodrich (1943-) of Utah State University.

References

External links
Photo of herbarium specimen at Missouri Botanical Garden, collected in Utah in 1981, isotype of Erigeron goodrichii

goodrichii
Flora of Utah
Plants described in 1983
Flora without expected TNC conservation status